The 2008–09 Ohio Bobcats women's basketball team represented Ohio University during the 2008–09 NCAA Division I women's basketball season. The Bobcats, led by first year head coach Semeka Randall, played their home games at the Convocation Center in Athens, Ohio as a member of the Mid-American Conference. They finished the season 13–18 and 7–9 in MAC play.

Preseason
The preseason poll was announced by the league office on October 30, 2008. Ohio was picked fourth in the MAC East

Preseason women's basketball poll
(First place votes in parenthesis)

East Division
 
 
 
 Ohio

West Division

Preseason All-MAC

Schedule

|-
!colspan=9 style=| Non-conference regular season

|-

|-
!colspan=9 style=| MAC regular season

|-
!colspan=9 style=| Non-conference regular season

|-
!colspan=9 style=| MAC regular season

|-
!colspan=9 style=| MAC Tournament

|-

Awards and honors

All-MAC Awards

References

Ohio
Ohio Bobcats women's basketball seasons
Ohio Bobcats women's basketball
Ohio Bobcats women's basketball